Alun Armstrong (born 22 February 1975) is an English former professional footballer and the current manager of National League North club Darlington. During his playing career, Armstrong operated primarily as a forward.

His career as a player, which ran between 1993 and 2007, included spells at Newcastle United, Stockport County, Middlesbrough, Ipswich Town, two spells at Darlington, Rushden & Diamonds and concluding it with a brief spell at Newcastle Blue Star. He has also enjoyed loan spells at Huddersfield Town, Bradford City and Doncaster Rovers.

Armstrong entered into club management in 2016, joining Blyth Spartans, achieving promotion to the National League North in his first season in charge. He left the club in 2019, agreeing to join Darlington as their new manager.

Playing career
Armstrong's first club was Newcastle United, where in October 1993 he came up from their youth team. He left in June 1994 having not played a competitive game for them, and signed with Stockport County for £50,000. In 200 games for them, he scored 62 goals. In February 1998 he joined Middlesbrough for £1.6m. He stayed until 2000, when in March he joined Huddersfield Town for three months on loan. In December 2000 he joined Ipswich Town for £500,000. In the three years he was at Ipswich he scored 19 goals in 94 appearances, including a header in Ipswich's 1–0 win over Inter Milan in the 2001–02 UEFA Cup. Armstrong described the goal as "probably the most important of my career, as long as we get a result out there (In the return leg)". Despite Armstrong scoring another goal in the return leg from the penalty spot, Ipswich were knocked out with an aggregate score of 4–2.

From December 2003 until March 2004 he was on loan to Bradford City, scoring once against Norwich City, and in September 2004 he joined Darlington on a free transfer. He left Darlington in June 2005, to join Rushden & Diamonds. He scored once for Rushden, his goal coming against Halifax Town in the FA Cup. After a spell on loan at Doncaster Rovers, he re-signed for Darlington in August 2006 to join the club on a second spell, before leaving them again at the end of the 2006–07 season. He scored once in his second spell at Darlington, against Hereford. He signed for Newcastle Blue Star in the UniBond Division One North before quitting days after receiving a red card against Gateshead.

Managerial career

Blyth Spartans
On 22 September 2016, Armstrong was appointed as the new manager of Northern Premier League Premier Division side Blyth Spartans. In his first season in charge of the Green Army, he guided them to win the league title at the first attempt, achieving National League North status for the first time since their relegation from the sixth tier at the end of the 2011–12 season.

In their first season back in the National League divisions, Armstrong led Spartans to a tenth-placed finish, four points adrift from play-off qualification. In their following league campaign, Armstrong's side saw a huge boost of form, eventually concluding the season in sixth place, qualifying for the divisional play-off quarter-finals, his side failed to continue to the semi-finals after defeat to Altrincham on penalties, having recorded a 2–2 draw prior though extra time could not see Spartans push for victory.

Darlington
On 21 May 2019, Armstrong was appointed as the new manager of fellow National League North club Darlington, replacing Tommy Wright.

An impressive start to the 2022–23 season saw Armstrong awarded the National League North Manager of the Month award for September 2022, winning all four of their matches across the month and climbing to 3rd position from 17th at the start of the month.

Personal life
His son Luke is also a footballer.

He has another son Rhys who is at Darlington with him.

Career statistics

Managerial statistics
As of 24 September 2022:

Honours

As a player
Stockport County
Football League Second Division runner-up: 1996–97

Middlesbrough
Football League First Division runner-up: 1997–98

As a manager
Individual
National League North Manager of the Month: September 2022

References

External links

Profile on Pride of Anglia website
Armstrong Coup For Blue Star

1975 births
Living people
Footballers from Gateshead
English footballers
English football managers
Association football forwards
Newcastle United F.C. players
Stockport County F.C. players
Middlesbrough F.C. players
Huddersfield Town A.F.C. players
Ipswich Town F.C. players
Bradford City A.F.C. players
Darlington F.C. players
Rushden & Diamonds F.C. players
Doncaster Rovers F.C. players
Newcastle Blue Star F.C. players
English Football League players
Premier League players
Blyth Spartans A.F.C. managers
Darlington F.C. managers
National League (English football) managers